Maria de Lourdes Pereira dos Santos Van-Dúnem (29 April 1935 – 4 January 2006) was an Angolan singer. Usually called Lourdes Van-Dúnem, she was born in Luanda, and rose to stardom in the 1960s with the group Ngola Ritmos. She recorded her first album, Monami, with this group. She toured several times in Portugal, Algeria, and Brazil, in addition to performances in Angola. After her first album, most of her career was spent with the group Jovens do Prenda.

She received several awards and honors, the notable of which being "the Most Powerful of the Angolan music." during the festival "Sun City" in South Africa during 1997 and the diploma of the National Radio of Angola, year-end program "The Best Female Voice of Angolan music" during 1997.

She died in 2006 of typhoid fever and was survived by her daughter. The President of Angola, Jose Eduardo dos Santos, attended her funeral.

Early life
Lourdes Van-Dúnem was born in Luanda in Angola on 29 April 1935. She did her primary education at the African National League (Ligga Nacional Africana), secondary school at Colégio de Dona Castro and Silva. Her later education was at D. João II and her highest education was secondary school. She started as a singer during her school times. She has worked as an announcer in Voz de Angola where she is believed to have learnt speaking in Kimbundu, though she was singing in the language for years. She was a singer in clubs during her early career and one of the few recognized female singers in the country during a 60s, when the music field in Angola was dominated by male singers.

Musical career
Her musical career began in 1960 when she joined the "Ngola Ritmos" band along with Liceu Vieira Dias, José de Fontes Pereira, Amadeu Amorim and Belita Palma, who would all go on to become legends in Angolan music and supporters of the anti-colonial movement MPLA. Van-Dúnem recorded her first album Monami, which was highly acclaimed. During this period, she travelled around Angola and Portugal for her performances. She joined the Jovens do Prenda band during the 70s. During this period, she performed in different countries like South Africa, Portugal, Brazil, Algeria, France, Spain and Zimbabwe. During 80s, she was the Secretary of State for Culture and travelled widely in the north and south of Portugal. During 1997, she published the second version of "Womanhood", with the theme of New Africa / Portugal. During 1996, she recorded SOWHY disc in Paris and late on 29 August, recorded "Womanhood" CD in Portugal.

Recognition and social work
On 29 March 1991 she was awarded with the diploma of "Female Voice oldest of Angola" in Hotel Turismo. She was awarded an honorary degree "homage to the pillars of the Angolan music" on 31 June 1993.  On the 420th anniversary of the foundation of Luanda city on 24 January 1996, she was conferred the "government diploma Luanda City". During 1996, she was part of "So Why" project of the International Red Cross Committee (ICRC) together with other celebrities in Africa. An album with six prominent singer including her and documentary was recorded along with a book titled Woza Africa, whose profit went to the war victims in Africa. The foreword was written by Nelson Mandela and the campaign was for supporting the victims of civil war during 1997. On 3 September 1997, she was awarded "the Most Powerful of the Angolan music." during the festival "Sun City" in South Africa. On 31 December 1997, she was awarded the diploma of the National Radio of Angola, year-end program "The Best Female Voice in Angolan music".
 
She died of typhoid on 4 January 2006 and was survived by her daughter. The President of Angola, José Eduardo dos Santos, attended her funeral.

References

1935 births
2006 deaths
20th-century Angolan women singers
Deaths from typhoid fever
Infectious disease deaths in Angola
People from Luanda